= Chisomaga =

Given name

- Gender: Unisex
- Language: Igbo

Origin
- Origin: Igbo
- Meaning: 'God goes with me'
- Region of origin: Igboland

Chisomaga is an Igbo given name meaning 'God follows me' or 'God goes with me.'
